M. K. Ashok is an Indian politician and was a member of the 14th Tamil Nadu Legislative Assembly from the Velachery constituency in Chennai District. He represented the All India Anna Dravida Munnetra Kazhagam party.

The elections of 2016 resulted in his constituency being won by Vagai Chanderasekar. Ashok was one of thirteen AIADMK MLAs in the Greater Chennai area who were deselected by the party, apparently in an attempt to thwart a potential anti-incumbency backlash from the electorate following the recent flooding. It was felt that fresh faces would put some distance between the past and the present.

On 22 June 2015, Ashok, his wife and a relative were injured in a car accident at the village of Pudusukkampatti, near Melur, Madurai. The three, along with a driver who escaped uninjured, were on their way to attend a funeral in Paramakudi when the accident occurred.

Electoral performance

References 

Tamil Nadu MLAs 2011–2016
All India Anna Dravida Munnetra Kazhagam politicians
Living people
Year of birth missing (living people)